Evanston is an unincorporated community in Huff Township, Spencer County, in the U.S. state of Indiana.

History
A post office was established at Evanston in 1891, and remained in operation until it was discontinued in 1989.

Geography

The nearest city is Tell City.

References

Unincorporated communities in Indiana
Unincorporated communities in Spencer County, Indiana
Southwestern Indiana